Pablo Daniel Piatti (born 31 March 1989) is an Argentine professional footballer who plays for Estudiantes de La Plata. He operates mainly as a left winger, but can also play as a forward.

He spent the vast majority of his career in Spain after starting out at Estudiantes, appearing in 313 La Liga matches over 14 seasons and scoring a total of 48 goals for Almería, Valencia, Espanyol and Elche. He also represented Toronto FC in Major League Soccer, having signed in 2020. 

Piatti was capped once for the Argentina national team, in 2011.

Club career

Estudiantes
He made the headlines when coach Diego Simeone gave him his first opportunity against Newell's Old Boys on 18 November 2006, as the player was just 17. He scored the winning goal (2–1) deep into injury time, and became one of the heroes of Estudiantes' championship-winning team.

Piatti made the side's starting eleven in the 2007 Clausura tournament, alongside José Luis Calderón, José Sosa, and Juan Sebastián Verón.

Almería
After making 60 appearances in all competitions for Estudiantes in two years, Piatti was sold to UD Almería in Spain for an undisclosed fee believed to be in the region of €7 million. Initially an undisputed starter, notably netting in a 1–1 home draw against Real Madrid, he struggled after the arrival, midway through his first season, of Mexican coach Hugo Sánchez.

In the 2009–10 campaign, without the presence of striker Álvaro Negredo, Piatti was much more depended upon in scoring matters and netted seven times in 35 matches, joint-second in the team as they finished in 13th position. On 23 September 2009 he opened and closed the scoresheet in a 2–2 draw at Atlético Madrid and, in the second La Liga match between the two teams, netted a last-minute winner (1–0).

Valencia

On 5 July 2011, Almería and Valencia CF reached an agreement for the transfer of Piatti, with the player signing a five-year contract for a fee of €7.5 million. He struggled to reproduce his previous form during most of his first season with the Che, but did feature in 47 official matches.

Piatti scored his first official goal for Valencia on 19 January 2012, netting the 3–1 in the 45th minute of an eventual 4–1 home victory over Levante UD in the quarter-finals of the Copa del Rey. He added another two in the second leg (3–0).

After Jordi Alba and Jérémy Mathieu developed an efficient left-wing partnership, Piatti was used inconsistently by managers Mauricio Pellegrino, Ernesto Valverde and Miroslav Đukić, also struggling with some injury problems. He was transferlisted against his will by the latter in the summer of 2013.

After the dismissal of Đukić due to poor results, however, new boss Juan Antonio Pizzi showed faith in his compatriot Piatti, who repaid the former's confidence by finishing 2013–14 with five league goals from 17 appearances, one of those coming in a 3–2 win at FC Barcelona.

Following the purchase of the club by businessman Peter Lim, Piatti continued being a key player under Nuno Espírito Santo, being dubbed Pablito by the manager.

Espanyol

Piatti was loaned to RCD Espanyol for one year on 16 July 2016, with a buyout clause. The following 24 May, after scoring a career-best ten goals to help his team to the eighth position, he signed a permanent three-year deal with the club. 

In February 2019, during a home match against Rayo Vallecano, Piatti suffered an injury to both his right knee's anterior cruciate and internal lateral ligaments, going on to be sidelined for several months.

Toronto FC
In February 2020, Piatti moved to Toronto FC in Major League Soccer as a Designated Player, signing a one-year deal. Later that month, however, he was ruled out of the opening of the season after picking up a hamstring strain in training. He made his debut on 13 July, in a 2–2 draw against D.C. United in the group stages of the MLS is Back Tournament. He scored his first two goals on 18 August, in a 3–0 home win over Vancouver Whitecaps FC in his side's first match since the return of the regular season. 

The team declined their option to extend Piatti's contract on 30 November 2020.

Elche
Piatti returned to the Spanish top division on 6 March 2021, joining Elche CF. He scored his only goal on 6 January 2022, in the 2–1 away defeat of Almería in the Spanish Cup.

Return to Estudiantes
On 14 June 2022, the 33-year old Piatti returned to his former club Estudiantes, on a deal until June 2024.

International career
Shortly after making his senior debut for Estudiantes, Piatti was part of the Argentina squad that won the 2007 FIFA U-20 World Cup in Canada. The youngest player in the roster, he managed to play six of seven games.

On 5 June 2011, Piatti made his debut for the senior side, as national team boss Sergio Batista handed him a start in a 1–2 friendly loss with Poland.

Style of play
A talented, skilful and diminutive player with an eye for goal, Piatti is capable of contributing to his team's offensive play by both scoring and assisting goals; moreover, he can shoot with either foot, despite being naturally left–footed. Normally a winger, he is also able to play as a forward, but he has even been deployed in a deeper, more creative role, behind the main striker. He usually plays on the left side of the pitch, although he can also play on the right flank. A dynamic, explosive and fleet–footed attacker, he is known for his turn of pace, which along with his dribbling technique enables him to get past opponents and make runs into the penalty area. Regarded as a promising player in his youth, his playing style was initially likened to that of compatriot Lionel Messi.

Career statistics

Club

International

Honours
Estudiantes
Argentine Primera División: 2006 Apertura

Argentina U-20
FIFA U-20 World Cup: 2007

Individual
UEFA La Liga Team of the Season: 2016–17

References

External links

CiberChe biography and stats 

1989 births
Living people
Argentine people of Italian descent
Sportspeople from Córdoba Province, Argentina
Argentine footballers
Association football wingers
Association football forwards
Argentine Primera División players
Estudiantes de La Plata footballers
La Liga players
UD Almería players
Valencia CF players
RCD Espanyol footballers
Elche CF players
Major League Soccer players
Designated Players (MLS)
Toronto FC players
Argentina under-20 international footballers
Argentina international footballers
Argentine expatriate footballers
Expatriate footballers in Spain
Expatriate soccer players in Canada
Argentine expatriate sportspeople in Spain
Argentine expatriate sportspeople in Canada